Melophobia is the third studio album by American rock band Cage the Elephant. Recorded at St. Charles in Nashville, Tennessee and produced by Jay Joyce, the album was released on October 8, 2013, through RCA Records. It is also the final album that features lead guitarist Lincoln Parish.

Background
For Melophobia, Cage the Elephant attempted to distance themselves from comparisons of the sound that influenced them, shutting themselves off from as much recorded music as possible. Melophobia means "fear of music;" the band did not view the term literally, but rather thought of the term as "a fear of creating music to project premeditated images of self, like catering to cool, or making music to project an image of being intellectual or artistic or poetic, rather than just trying to be an honest communicator."

Frontman Matthew Shultz viewed the record as a battle "to remain transparent and to remain honest." Isaac Brock (frontman of Modest Mouse) once told his friend Tiger Merritt (of Morning Teleportation) that "if you're not slightly embarrassed to sing the lyrics, you're probably not writing a good song," and encouraged him to refrain from attempting to write poetically but rather naturally. Shultz said this made sense to him. When writing new tracks, Shultz would often doodle an image alongside his lyrics for visual reference.

Composition
"Come a Little Closer" was inspired by a morning in which Shultz woke up in a São Paulo hotel and opened his window to watch the sunrise over the favelas. Finding the makeshift housing comparable to an anthill, he soon found himself wondering what each soul inside each borough felt, whether it be heartache, love, loss or joy. Shultz viewed "Telescope" as the breakthrough song in writing honestly; he based it on his loneliness. During a bout of seasonal depression, he spent time in his new home for the first time after nonstop touring and found himself "doing life's meaningless tasks to fill the void to pass the time", including obsessively decorating and feeling obligated to spend time in each room. "Black Widow" features the usage of brass horns which Brad had been anxious to use for a while, however Matt was against the inclusion of such instrumentation which would eventually lead to a "big argument".

Critical reception

Melophobia has received positive reviews from contemporary music critics. Brian Mansfield of USA Today designated it "Album of the Week," summarizing that "Melophobia may mean 'fear of music,' but there's nothing to be afraid of: Its glorious chaos makes for thrilling listening." While August Brown of the Los Angeles Times viewed Melophobia as "a bit more stoned and mellow" than its predecessor, "they're in a class of their own [...] Let's just be glad to have such imagination on our drive time rock radio again." Holly Gleason of Paste described the album as "post-modern glam revival," praising Jay Joyce's production and opining that "Melophobia is united in both the urgency of the performances and the seemingly toxic love affairs that populate these songs." Rolling Stone Jon Dolan considered the record a combination of "Sixties garage rock, Seventies punk and Eighties alt-rock into excellently weird new shapes." Doug McCausland of Alternative Nation said Melophobia was Cage's strongest record at the time.

Alternative Press Jason Schreurs wrote that Melophobia "is, at its best, ambitious and teeming with ideas and, at worst, one heck of a mish-mash of sounds."

Commercial performance
The album debuted at  No. 15 on the Billboard 200 albums chart on its first week of release, with around 18,000 copies sold in the United States. It also debuted at No. 6 on both the Top Rock Albums and the Alternative Albums charts. As of October 2015, the album has sold 174,000 copies in the US.

Track listing

Personnel

Cage the Elephant
Matthew Shultz – lead vocals
Lincoln Parish – lead guitar, keyboards
Brad Shultz – rhythm guitar, keyboards
Daniel Tichenor – bass, backing vocals
Jared Champion – drums

Additional musicians
 Jeff Coffin – saxophone on "Black Widow", "Hypocrite" and "Teeth"
 Roy Agee – trombone on "Black Widow", "Hypocrite" and "Teeth"
 Mike Haynes – trumpet on "Black Widow", "Hypocrite" and "Teeth"
 Alison Mosshart – vocals on "It's Just Forever"

Production
Jay Joyce – production
 Tom Elmhirst – mixing engineer
 Ben Baptie – assistant mixing engineer
 Jason Hall – engineer
 Matt Wheeler – assistant engineer
 Tom Coyne – mastering
Artwork
R. Clint Colburn –  cover art

Charts

Certifications

References

2013 albums
Cage the Elephant albums
RCA Records albums
Albums produced by Jay Joyce